"Three of a Kind" is the twentieth episode of the sixth season of the science fiction television series The X-Files. It premiered on the Fox network on May 2, 1999 in the United States. The episode was written by Vince Gilligan and John Shiban, and directed by Bryan Spicer. The episode is a "Monster-of-the-Week" story, unconnected to the series' wider mythology. "Three of a Kind" earned a Nielsen household rating of 8.2, being watched by 12.9 million people in its initial broadcast. The episode received mixed to positive reviews from critics, with some noting that the episode served as a stop-gap.

The show centers on FBI special agents Fox Mulder (David Duchovny) and Dana Scully (Gillian Anderson) who work on cases linked to the paranormal, called X-Files. Mulder is a believer in the paranormal, while the skeptical Scully has been assigned to debunk his work. In this episode, The Lone Gunmen run into the enigmatic Susanne Modeski. After deceiving Scully into joining them, the trio soon find out that Susanne's fiancé is planning to use her new brainwashing drug for political assassinations.

"Three of a Kind" functions as a sequel of sorts to the fifth season episode "Unusual Suspects", concluding the story of The Lone Gunmen and Susanne Modeski, the woman who led to the creation of the trio. While Mulder played a supporting role in "Unusual Suspects", the concept is reversed in "Three of a Kind", with Scully helping out The Lone Gunmen.

Plot
During a high-stakes poker game Lone Gunman John Fitzgerald Byers (Bruce Harwood) is thrown out after being exposed as a fraud at a government convention in Las Vegas. Unbeknownst to Richard Langly (Dean Haglund) and Melvin Frohike (Tom Braidwood), Byers is still harboring an attraction to Susanne Modeski, a fellow conspirator who mysteriously disappeared almost ten years ago. Byers hopes that he will meet her at the convention.

The Lone Gunmen cleverly trick Agent Dana Scully (Gillian Anderson) into coming to Las Vegas using a text to speech program. Their friend Jimmy uses his special technique for gaining access to a secret meeting room where he believes he will learn about new assassination techniques employed by the government. However, Jimmy is discovered and injected with a mystery drug which forces him to kill himself. Meanwhile, Byers discovers that Susanne is alive and well, but has seemingly become a secretive government agent.

Scully is performing Jimmy's autopsy when she is attacked by an agent who injects something into her, causing her to collapse. After being confronted by Byers, Susanne reveals that she is pretending to have switched sides so she, along with her fiancee Grant Ellis, can slow progress on the government's harmful initiatives. She works alongside the Gunmen to set up Grant, whom she discovers has been lying to her.

Timmy, the late Jimmy's friend, asks Langly to attend a Dungeons & Dragons game in Jimmy's honor. The game, however, is a setup to inject Langly with a drug that effectively controls the subject's mind, much like Scully and Jimmy. Frohike finds an extremely flirtatious Scully at the bar with a large cluster of men around her, including Morris Fletcher. He takes her back to the suite where Susanne recognizes the effects of the drug, which she identifies as "anoetic histamine". She reveals that she had not actually made the compound, except for a small batch accessible only to her and Grant, confirming his betrayal.

Susanne counteracts the weapon's effect on Scully as Langly returns. Langly reports to Timmy the next morning and is given his instructions: enter the meeting room using the provided pass and fire three rounds into Susanne Modeski. Scully attempts to enter the meeting hall but is stopped by security outside. Langly draws a gun and shoots Susanne Modeski three times in the chest during the break. Scully comes in with the guard and has him call for an ambulance. Byers and Frohike arrive as the EMTs and take her away on a stretcher. It is revealed that Susanne realized Langly had been injected and counteracted the drug's effect on him. Together, Scully, Susanne, and the Lone Gunmen orchestrated an elaborate ruse to allow Susanne to escape. Unfortunately the ruse fails, as Timmy Landau tastes the "blood" on the floor and realizes it is just corn syrup.

Grant Ellis is taken to Susanne Modeski by Scully so she can confront him about why he gave the drug to the government. She is furious as she could have been killed had she not checked Langly the night before. Ellis admits that he only betrayed her because the government threatened his own life. Timmy arrives, guns down Grant Ellis, and takes Susanne to the Lone Gunmen's suite.

Timmy prepares to gun down Langly and Frohike, but is injected with the mind control drug by Byers. As it takes hold of him and he collapses, and the Lone Gunmen successfully mind-control him into turning himself in. Byers explains to Susanne Modeski that, for all intents and purposes, she is deceased and that she has a new identity. She asks Byers to go with her to start a new life, but he explains he has to keep up the fight. She kisses him goodbye and hands over a wedding ring meant for Grant Ellis.

Production

Background and writing
"Three of a Kind" functions as a sequel of sorts to the fifth season episode "Unusual Suspects", concluding a minor story-arc featuring The Lone Gunmen and Susanne Modeski, the woman who led to the creation of the trio. At the time of filming for "Three of a Kind", David Duchovny, who portrays Fox Mulder, was unavailable for filming because he was preparing his directing debut, "The Unnatural". (Only David Duchovny's voice appears in the episode, during a scene in which The Lone Gunmen electronically synthesize it to convince Scully to travel to Las Vegas.) To compensate for this loss, co-executive producers Vince Gilligan and John Shiban decided to write an episode based around The Lone Gunmen. The writers wanted to bring back several characters and unresolved plot lines, mostly notably the disappearance of Susanne Modeski, who had last appeared in season five's "The Unusual Suspects".

Gilligan explained, "I'd been thinking a lot about what happened to Susanne Modeski—what happened to her after she drove off with X in that mysterious car at the end of 'Unusual Suspects'". Gilligan and Shiban soon formulated a plot that revolved around the Lone Gunmen in Las Vegas, "Las Vegas just seemed a really good place to put these guys", according to Gilligan. He explained: "First of all, because the idea of them running through a casino is instantly hilarious. But the other thing [...] is that Las Vegas is in some ways the most watched city in the world". The entire sub-plot featuring Susanne Modeski caused a minor continuity error that had to be retconned. Bruce Harwood, the actor who portrayed Byers, originally wore a wedding ring when he first portrayed the character, noting, "I'd worn my wedding ring [during the first part of the series] so I imagined a married life for Byers". During the filming of "Unusual Suspects"—an episode that would largely feature Byers feeling a romantic connection to Susanne—Harwood removed his wedding ring, deducing that in 1989, when the episode took place, Byers had not been married yet. However, "Three of a Kind"—which takes place in 1999—features Byers once again romantically drawn to Susanne. Harwood explained, "And then [the producers] brought back the character Suzanne  Modeski back in season six, and that was supposed to be in the present. So I had to redo my back story; I said Byers had been divorced".

Filming
Despite worries about going over budget, Fox allowed the production crew of The X-Files to film on location in Las Vegas, making the city one of the few to effectively "play itself" in the series. However, only two days were allotted for Las Vegas, and the majority of the episode was filmed in California at the Century Plaza and Park Hyatt hotels. (In fact, Gillian Anderson herself never had to leave Los Angeles.) Location manager Ilt Jones noted that The X-Files crew's desire to film on location at various hotels in Las Vegas caused a bidding war, "We went down this list of forty or fifty hotels known to be film-friendly. [...] At first, the reaction was sort of lukewarm, then all of a sudden someone realized that this was The X-Files, for heavens sake, seen by I-can't-tell-you-how-many millions [...] then this huge bidding war broke out". Eventually, Monte Carlo Resort and Casino was selected for shooting. The hotel gave The X-Files crew permission to film anywhere in the hotel during day hours, as well as full access to the hotel's illuminated message board, in exchange for a special billing in the credits denoting "Production Assistance Provided by" and the inclusion of shots featuring the hotel's name in the episode.

Broadcast and reception
"Three of a Kind" first aired in the United States on May 2, 1999. This episode earned a Nielsen rating of 8.2, with a 12 share, meaning that roughly 8.2 percent of all television-equipped households, and 12 percent of households watching television, were tuned in to the episode. It was viewed by 12.94 million viewers. The episode aired in the United Kingdom and Ireland on Sky1 on July 4, 1999 and received 0.87 million viewers, making it the second most watched episode that week. Fox promoted the episode with the tagline "What's gotten into Scully? Tonight, when Scully hits Vegas, you'll see a side of her you've never seen before."

The episode received mostly mixed reviews from critics, with many noting that the episode served as a stop-gap. Robert Shearman and Lars Pearson, in their book Wanting to Believe: A Critical Guide to The X-Files, Millennium & The Lone Gunmen, rated "Three of a Kind" two-and-a-half stars out of five, calling the episode "likeable and good-natured, and utterly redundant, this passes forty-five minutes pleasantly enough, but you'll be hard pushed to remember them afterwards". Paula Vitaris from Cinefantastique gave the episode a moderately positive review and awarded it two-and-a-half stars out of four. Vitaris noted that the episode did "an adequate job, but all in all, this is a filler episode, more substitutes than the real thing".

Tom Kessenich, in his book Examination: An Unauthorized Look at Seasons 6–9 of the X-Files wrote that, "'Three of a Kind' took the premise [of the Lone Gunmen] and ran with it, offering up a quasi-entertaining effort that indulges [the trio]'s paranoia, banishes Mulder from sight and offers up a very flirtatious Dana Scully. It was all cute and harmless. Kinda like The Lone Gunmen themselves." Zack Handlen of The A.V. Club awarded the episode a "B+" and called it "the second part of a story which didn’t really need one" but also noted that the "laid-back, let’s just hang out and have some fun vibe" of the episode made the entry "very, very easy to watch." Furthermore, he praised the scene wherein Scully is drugged, calling it "hilarious" and "glorious".

Footnotes

Bibliography

External links

 

1999 American television episodes
Television episodes set in Clark County, Nevada
Television episodes set in Nevada
Television episodes written by Vince Gilligan
The X-Files (season 6) episodes